The Hits of Jo Stafford is a 1964 album by Jo Stafford, issued by Capitol Records as catalog number ST-1921. It consists of songs she helped make famous, re-recorded in stereo.

Track listing

References 

1963 greatest hits albums
Jo Stafford compilation albums
Capitol Records compilation albums
Albums conducted by Paul Weston